Myanmar competed at the 2014 Summer Youth Olympics, in Nanjing, China from 16 August to 28 August 2014.

Archery

Myanmar was given a quota to compete by the tripartite committee.

Individual

Team

Athletics

Myanmar qualified one athlete.

Qualification Legend: Q=Final A (medal); qB=Final B (non-medal); qC=Final C (non-medal); qD=Final D (non-medal); qE=Final E (non-medal)

Girls
Track & road events

Sailing

Myanmar qualified one boat based on its performance at the Techno 293 Asian Continental Qualifiers.

Weightlifting

Myanmar qualified 1 quota in the girls' events based on the team ranking after the 2013 Weightlifting Youth World Championships.

Girls

References

2014 in Burmese sport
Nations at the 2014 Summer Youth Olympics
Myanmar at the Youth Olympics